Anton Iaria (born 24 January 1996) is a Italy international rugby league footballer who plays as a  for the Barrow Raiders in the Betfred Championship.

Background
Iaria was born in Australia. He is of Italian descent.

Playing career

Club career
Iaria played in 31 games, and scored 6 tries for the Barrow Raiders in the 2022 RFL Championship.

International career
In 2022 Iaria was named in the Italy squad for the 2021 Rugby League World Cup.

References

External links
Barrow Raiders profile
Italy profile

1996 births
Living people
Australian rugby league players
Australian people of Italian descent
Barrow Raiders players
Eastern Suburbs Tigers players
Italy national rugby league team players
Rugby league props